Sunset on the Desert is a 1942 American Western film directed by Joseph Kane and starring Roy Rogers, and George "Gabby" Hayes.

Plot

Cast 
Roy Rogers as Roy Rogers / Deputy Bill Sloan
George "Gabby" Hayes as Gabby Whittaker
Lynne Carver as Ann Kirby
Frank M. Thomas as Judge Alvin Kirby
Beryl Wallace as Julie Craig
Glenn Strange as Deputy Louie Meade
Douglas Fowley as Ramsay McCall
Fred Burns as Jim Prentiss
Roy Barcroft as Henchman Deputy
 Henry Wills as Deputy Ed
Forrest Taylor as George Belknap
Sons of the Pioneers as Musicians

Soundtrack 
Sons of the Pioneers - "It's a Lie" (Written by Bob Nolan)
Roy Rogers - "Remember Me" (Written by Bob Nolan)
Roy Rogers and the Sons of the Pioneers - "Faithful Pal O' Mine" (Written by Tim Spencer)
"Don Juan" (Written by Tim Spencer and Glenn Spencer)
"Yippi-Yi Your Troubles Away" Written by Tim Spencer and Glenn Spencer

External links 

1942 films
1942 Western (genre) films
American black-and-white films
Republic Pictures films
American Western (genre) films
Films directed by Joseph Kane
1940s English-language films
1940s American films